Alessandro Scanziani (born 23 March 1953) is an Italian professional football coach and a former player, who played as a midfielder.

Playing career
Scanziani was born in Verano Brianza. He began his career at Meda before spending a season on loan at Livorno. Three seasons at Como followed, in which he won promotion to Serie A. Although he impressed as a skilful midfielder with an eye for goal, this could not prevent Como from being relegated. Scanziani joined Inter Milan a year later and played for two seasons.

A move to Ascoli in 1979 saw him form an outstanding midfield partnership with Gianfranco Bellotto and Adelio Moro. This trio accounted for a large share of Ascoli's goals over the next two seasons and led the side to a finish of 5th in 1980, the club's highest-ever placing.

He moved to Sampdoria in 1981 and helped the side to promotion, and played alongside Liam Brady in the team's midfield in Serie A. He later played for Genoa and Arezzo.

External links
Career Stats

Living people
1953 births
Italian footballers
Association football midfielders
Serie A players
Serie B players
A.C. Meda 1913 players
Como 1907 players
U.S. Livorno 1915 players
Inter Milan players
Ascoli Calcio 1898 F.C. players
U.C. Sampdoria players
Genoa C.F.C. players
S.S. Arezzo players
Italian football managers
Como 1907 managers
Modena F.C. managers
F.C. Lumezzane V.G.Z. A.S.D. managers
S.P.A.L. managers
Calcio Lecco 1912 managers
S.S.D. Pro Sesto managers